Feng Yu (born 30 September 1999) is a Chinese synchronised swimmer. She won a gold medal (China's first ever) and 2 silver medals at the 2017 World Aquatics Championships. She also won 4 silver medals at the 2016 Asian Swimming Championships.

References
 集体自由组合高分加冕 中国花游首夺世锦赛冠军！

External links
 

Living people
1999 births
Chinese synchronized swimmers

World Aquatics Championships medalists in synchronised swimming
Synchronized swimmers at the 2017 World Aquatics Championships
Synchronized swimmers from Beijing
Asian Games gold medalists for China
Medalists at the 2018 Asian Games
Artistic swimmers at the 2018 Asian Games
Asian Games medalists in artistic swimming
Artistic swimmers at the 2019 World Aquatics Championships
Artistic swimmers at the 2022 World Aquatics Championships
Synchronized swimmers at the 2020 Summer Olympics
Olympic synchronized swimmers of China
Olympic silver medalists for China
Olympic medalists in synchronized swimming
Medalists at the 2020 Summer Olympics